Begum Quamrun Nahar Zafar is a Jatiya Party (Ershad) politician and the former Member of Parliament of Chittagong-10.

Career
Zafar was elected to parliament from Chittagong-10 as a Jatiya Party candidate in 1988. She served as a Member of Parliament from the reserved women's seat 29 in the Second Parliament in 1979 and in the Third Parliament in 1986.

References

Jatiya Party politicians
Living people
4th Jatiya Sangsad members
Women members of the Jatiya Sangsad
Year of birth missing (living people)
2nd Jatiya Sangsad members
3rd Jatiya Sangsad members
20th-century Bangladeshi women politicians